The speed limit in localities is set at 50 km/h, but the owner of the road (usually the state) can apply for permission to raise it up to 80 km/h for automobiles and motorcycles or decrease it as low as 10 km/h for tramways and 30 km/h for automobiles. It is because of this that some city boulevards have a speed limit of 60 km/h, and some National Road stretches that pass through villages have a speed limit of 70 km/h.

Out of localities, the speed limits for categories A and B (motorcycles and automobiles) are: 130 km/h on motorways, 100 km/h on expressways and E-roads, and 90 km/h on other roads. For categories C, D, and D1 (trucks and buses), the limits are: 100, 80, and 70 km/h respectively, and for categories A1, B1, and C1 (low weight/power motorcycles and automobiles) they are: 80, 70 and 60 km/h respectively. Tractors and mopeds have a maximum speed limit of 45 km/h both in and out of localities, and are not allowed on motorways. Any vehicle that can't reach a speed of 50 km/h can't use the motorways, including tractors.

Vehicles with trailers or semis must travel at 10 km/h less than the speed limit for their category, when out of localities. Overweight automobiles, trucks and buses or those transporting oversized or dangerous products have a speed limit of 30 km/h in localities and 60 km/h out of localities. Also, drivers with less than one year of experience or learning how to drive must travel at 20 km/h less than the speed limit for their category, when out of localities.

No legal sanction is established for driving within 10 km/h over the speed limit.

As of February 2019, the fines for surpassing the speed limits are:

 Class I - 2 to 3 fine-points for 11–20 km/h over the limit
 Class II - 4 to 5 fine-points for 21–30 km/h over the limit
 Class III - 6 to 8 fine-points for 31–40 km/h over the limit
 Class IV - 9 to 20 fine-points for 41–50 km/h over the limit
 Class V - 21 to 100 fine-points for more than 50 km/h over the limit, only for legal persons. Also, in this case, the license is suspended for 90 days.

Where a fine-point is calculated as 10% of the minimum economy wage in Romania. In 2018, the fine-point was 145 RON.

References

Romania
Transport in Romania